Adrien Perez may refer to:

 Adrien Perez (swimmer) (born 1988), Swiss swimmer
 Adrien Perez (soccer) (born 1995), American soccer player